The 6th Metro Manila Film Festival was held in 1980.

Fernando Poe, Jr. had his first Panday film, the undisputed top grosser of the festival; Nora Aunor had two entries: Lino Brocka's Bona and Laurice Guillen's Kung Ako'y Iiwan Mo; Vilma Santos came up with Danny Zialcita's Langis at Tubig;  Amy Austria in Marilou Diaz-Abaya's Brutal. Other entries were Basag with Alma Moreno, Taga sa Panahon with Christopher de Leon and Bembol Roco, and three comedy films: Tembong with Niño Muhlach, Kape't Gatas with Chiquito and Julie Vega, and Dang-Dong with Andrea Bautista (daughter of Ramon Revilla, Sr.).

The Festival's Best Picture was awarded to Premiere Productions' Taga sa Panahon. The awards were spread equally and the category for Best Child Performer was first introduced in this year received by Julie Vega.

Entries

Winners and nominees

Awards
Winners are listed first and highlighted in boldface.
Winners are listed first and highlighted in boldface.

Multiple awards

Commentary

Second Golden Age of Philippine film
The period of the Philippine film's artistic accomplishment begins in 1975 (three years after the dictator Ferdinand Marcos' declaration of Martial Law) and ending in the February 1986 People Power Revolution where the dictator Marcos lost his power. Nora Aunor's Bona and Himala in 1980 and 1982 respectively (both official entries of MMFF) achieves to represent the period where the accomplishments of two government institutions contributed to the emergence of New Cinema in the 1970s and 1980s. Her films are cinematically accomplished despite being politically engaged films, and the MMFF is able to make these films flourish during this period.

References

External links

Metro Manila Film Festival
MMFF
MMFF